Henry Holt (November 13, 1887 – March 2, 1944) was a politician from the U. S. state of North Dakota. He was born in Illinois. Holt resided in Grand Forks, North Dakota. In 1934, he was an unsuccessful candidate for U.S. Senator from North Dakota against incumbent Lynn Frazier. In 1940, he was a delegate to the Democratic National Convention which nominated U.S. President Franklin Delano Roosevelt for a third term. In 1942, he was elected as a Democrat to serve as the 21st Lieutenant Governor of North Dakota under Governor John Moses from 1943 until his death the following year of lung cancer. Upon learning of Holt's death, the governor ordered all flags across North Dakota to fly at half-mast.

References

External links
Political Graveyard

1944 deaths
Lieutenant Governors of North Dakota
Politicians from Grand Forks, North Dakota
1887 births
20th-century American politicians